Marie-Lou Nahhas (born September 7, 1989) is a Lebanese American actress, model, and activist best known for playing Egyptian-born inmate Shani Abboud on Season 7 of Orange Is the New Black. Season 7 aired on Netflix in July 2019. 

She was a finalist for Miss Lebanon 2012. In August 2020, Nahhas appeared on the cover of Marie Claire Arabia.

Activism
After earning her master's degree, Nahhas moved to New York City to pursue her acting career professionally in theatre and film.
In 2019, it was announced that Nahhas would be participating in Dubai's STEP Conference 2020, a tech festival for start-ups, finance, and entrepreneurship. She is set to speak as part of the conference's speakers line-up.
Nahhas is vocal about ending female genital mutilation, visiting with victims in Africa, particularly in Ethiopia’s Afar region, with the United Nations Population Fund and posting regularly on her social media about positive progress made to eliminate the practice. Nahhas's character on Orange Is the New Black, Shani, was a victim of female genital mutilation.

Personal life 
Nahhas speaks English, French, Spanish, and Arabic.

Filmography

Film

Television

References

External links

Living people
Lebanese television actresses
Actresses from Beirut
University of Pittsburgh alumni
Duquesne University alumni
Lebanese emigrants to the United States
21st-century Lebanese actresses
1989 births